Bhagath Manuel (born November 26, 1986) is an Indian actor who appears in Malayalam cinema. He made his debut in Vineeth Sreenivasan's Malarvadi Arts Club. He is known for his performance in Doctor Love and Thattathin Marayathu and has appeared in more than 50 films.

Personal life

He married Daliya on 26 December 2011 and they later divorced. The couple's son Steve was born on 2 January 2013. In late September 2019 he married Shelin Cherian.

Filmography

References

External links
 

Male actors from Kerala
Male actors in Malayalam cinema
Indian male film actors
Living people
People from Muvattupuzha
21st-century Indian male actors
1986 births